Santa Cruz Skypark was an airport located in Scotts Valley, California, within Santa Cruz County.

Historical timeline

See also
 List of airports of Santa Cruz County

References

External links
  Abandoned & Little-Known Airfields: California: Monterey Area

Defunct airports in California
History of Santa Cruz County, California
Airports in Santa Cruz County, California
1947 establishments in California
1983 disestablishments in California
Airports established in 1947